Aanchal Thakur (born 28 August 1996) is an Indian female alpine skier. She represented India at the 2012 Winter Youth Olympics that took place in Innsbruck. In the 2012 Youth Winter Olympics she took part in the Alpine skiing - Girl's Slalom and Girl's Giant Slalom events. Thakur became the first Indian skier to win a medal in an international skiing event in 2018.

Personal life
She is the sister of Indian international skier Himanshu Thakur who represented India at the 2014 Winter Olympics.

Career
Thakur was named to India's 2017 Asian Winter Games team in February 2017.

In 2018, Thakur created history by becoming the first Indian skier ever to claim a medal in the international skiing event. She won the bronze medal in the 2018 Alpine Ejder 3200 Cup which was held in Turkey and was organised by the Federation Internationale de Ski.

Thakur won her second medal in the international skiing event at FIS Alpine Ski Competition held at Kolašin, Montenegro. She won the bronze medal at the 2021 event held in Montenegro under the banner of the Jamaican national championships.

Thakur won four silver medals at the UAE Alpine Slalom Championships held at Dubai in 2022 and thus qualified for the 2023 World Ski Championships. She also became the first Indian skier to win a silver medal in international skiing.

Alpine skiing results
All results are sourced from the International Ski Federation (FIS).

World Championship results

References

External links
 

1996 births
Living people
Indian female alpine skiers
People from Manali, Himachal Pradesh
Skiers from Himachal Pradesh
Sportswomen from Himachal Pradesh
21st-century Indian women
21st-century Indian people
Alpine skiers at the 2017 Asian Winter Games
Alpine skiers at the 2012 Winter Youth Olympics